Edmond (Ned) Slattery (1839 – 11 August 1927), known as "The Shiner", was a notable New Zealand swagger and rural labourer. He was born in  County Clare, Ireland in about 1839. He emigrated to Australia in 1869 and worked on the goldfields. In the early 1870's he came to new Zealand where his main area of living was Canterbury, Southland and Otago. He was famous at tricking publicans (and others) for drinks and such stories concerning "The Shiner" are numerous. He was known as a great "Character" and his arrival in towns was often noted in local newspapers. He was well known for dancing the Irish Jig in competitions at the New Year in Oamaru. Despite being a swagger he kept up a dignified attire and was a regular Catholic church-goer. He died in a charity home in Dunedin in 1927.

References

Further reading
Shining With The Shiner (1950) and Shiner Slattery (1964) both written by John A Lee.

1830s births
1927 deaths
Irish emigrants to New Zealand (before 1923)
People from County Clare
Andersons Bay Cemetery